Kemerovsky (masculine), Kemerovskaya (feminine), or Kemerovskoye (neuter) may refer to:
Kemerovsky District, a district of Kemerovo Oblast, Russia
Kemerovsky Urban Okrug, a municipal formation of Kemerovo Oblast, which the city of Kemerovo is incorporated as
Kemerovo Oblast (Kemerovskaya oblast), a federal subject of Russia